Nicola Pellegrini (died 1520) was a Roman Catholic prelate who served as Bishop of Fondi (1500–1520).

Biography
On 29 January 1500, Nicola Pellegrini was appointed during the papacy of Pope Alexander VI as Bishop of Fondi.
He served as Bishop of Fondi until his death in 1520.

References 

16th-century Italian Roman Catholic bishops
Bishops appointed by Pope Alexander VI
1520 deaths